The Juno Award for Global Music Album of the Year has been awarded since 1992, as recognition each year for the best world music album in Canada.  It has previously been known as other names including "Best World Best Recording" and "Best World Music Album", with the current name being established in 2022.

Winners

Best World Beat Recording (1992 - 1993)

Best Global Recording (1994 - 1995)

Best Global Album (1996 - 2002)

World Music Album of the Year (2003 - 2021)

Global Music Album of the Year (2022 - present)

References

Global Music
World music awards
Album awards